HMS Alarm was a 32-gun fifth-rate  of the Royal Navy, and was the first Royal Navy ship to bear this name. She was built at King's Yard in Harwich by John Barnard.

Copper-sheathed in 1761, she was the first ship in the Royal Navy to have a fully copper-sheathed hull.

History

Experiments with copper sheathing
Alarm initially saw deployment in the West Indies, where she experimentally had her hull sheathed in a thin layer of copper.  Firstly it was intended to reduce the considerable damage caused by the teredo woodworm , and secondly the well-established toxic property of copper was expected to lessen the speed-killing barnacle growth which always occurred on ships' hulls.  Alarms hull was first covered with soft stuff, which was hair, yarn and brown paper, and then covered with a layer of copper plates.

After a two-year deployment to the West Indies, Alarm was beached in order to examine the effects of the experiment. The copper had performed very well in protecting the hull from invasion by worm, and in preventing the growth of weed, for when in contact with water, the copper produced a poisonous film, composed mainly of oxychloride, that deterred these marine creatures. Furthermore, as this film was slightly soluble it gradually washed away, leaving no way in which marine life could attach itself to the ship.  Satisfied that the copper had had the desired effect, the Admiralty introduced copper sheathing on a number of frigates.

In 1776 Alarm was resurveyed.  It was soon discovered that the sheathing had become detached from the hull in many places because the iron nails which had been used to fasten the copper to the timbers had been "much rotted". Closer inspection revealed that some nails, which were less corroded, were insulated from the copper by brown paper which was trapped under the nail head. The copper had been delivered to the dockyard wrapped in the paper which was not removed before the sheets were nailed to the hull. The obvious conclusion therefore, and the one which had been highlighted in a separate report to the Admiralty in as early as 1763, was that iron should not be allowed direct contact with copper in a sea water environment if severe corrosion of the iron was to be avoided. Later ships were designed with this in mind. The Admiralty had largely suspended the programme of fitting ships with copper sheathing after the 1763 report, and had not shown any further interest in developing effective copper sheathing until 1775. In the meantime the copper sheathing was removed from Alarm, and several other test vessels until an effective solution to the corrosion problem could be developed.

Later in her career she was commanded by a young John Jervis, from 1769 onwards.  He sailed for the Mediterranean in May and arrived in Genoa on 7 September.  Aboard Alarm at this time was Samuel Hood, son of Alexander Hood, and one of the many members of the Hood family to serve at sea.  Samuel Hood served aboard Alarm from November 1765 to July 1772, in the post of purser.

Near loss
On the return voyage to England, on 6 April 1770, she was saved by Georges René Le Peley de Pléville from being wrecked off Marseilles. Alarm had been battered by a storm in the evening and ran aground on the coast of Provence amongst boulders, and was in imminent danger of breaking up.  Pléville quickly mustered the harbour pilots and rushed to the relief of the English.  By the time he was able to board her, Alarm had already almost heeled over many times, and began to run aground.  Pléville ordered a manœuvre that got her afloat again and brought her into harbour at Marseilles.  In gratitude for Pléville's actions, the Admiralty sent Jervis and Alarm back to Marseilles in December to deliver a letter which read

The present was a piece of silverware in the form of an urn, on which were engraved dolphins and other maritime attributes, with a model of the Alarm, and a richly engraved lid surmounted by a triton. Remarkable in its elegance of form and high level of finish and workmanship, this vase bore the English Coat of Arms, and had the following inscription, intended to preserve the memory of the event which had merited the present:

Thinking that he could not receive a gift from a foreign sovereign, de Pléville only accepted the urn after having been duly authorised to do so by the king of France.  Jervis was also extremely grateful to de Pléville, and eager for the chance to reward him.  He wrote to his sister from Alarm, anchored at Mahon on 27 December 1770:

Ten years later, de Pléville's devotion to the safety of the Alarm gained another reward, when his son – a young naval officer – was captured on board a frigate at the end of a battle in 1780 and taken to England. There, the British Admiralty sent him back to France without requiring a prisoner-exchange, after having authorised him to choose three other French naval officers to go with him.

The Admiralty were also greatly pleased by Jervis' actions in this matter, allowing his further promotion. From 1771 to May 1772, the ship became the "home" of the Duke of Gloucester, who was spending time in the Mediterranean because of ill health. Alarm then returned to England for paying off.

Off America
On 9 March 1783, Alarm was involved in one of the last naval battles of the American Revolutionary War, when Alarm, and the sloop of war Tobago intercepted two American vessels, the frigate  and the transport . The American ships were transporting bullion to the Continental forces and both sides were unaware that peace had been ratified over a month before. After a short battle between Sibyl and Alliance, the Americans escaped. Alarm did not herself actively participate in the engagement.

French Revolutionary Wars
Galgo, of 18 guns and 124 men, was under the command of Don Barber. She was sailing from Porto Rico to Trinidada and was carrying 80,335 dollars and provisions for the government at Trinidada. Alarm took Galgo into Grenada.

In 1796, Alarm had violated Trinidad's neutrality, so contributing to Spain's declaration of war on the side of Revolutionary France. In February 1797 Alarm was among the vessels of the British flotilla that captured Trinidad.

Fate

Alarm continued in service for a number of years, finally being broken up in September 1812 at Portsmouth having spent 64 years in service.

Citations and references

Citations

References
 
 Brian Lavery, The Ship of the Line – Volume 1: The development of the battlefleet 1650–1850. Conway Maritime Press, 2003. .
 Robert Gardiner, The First Frigates, Conway Maritime Press, London 1992. .
 David Lyon, The Sailing Navy List, Conway Maritime Press, London 1993. .
 Rif Winfield, British Warships in the Age of Sail, 1714 to 1792, Seaforth Publishing, London 2007. .
 Biography: John Jervis at the Royal Navy Museum website

External links
 

Frigates of the Royal Navy
Ships built in Harwich
1758 ships
Maritime incidents in 1770